The Residence, also known as Woodberry, is a historic home located on the grounds of Woodberry Forest School at Woodberry Forest, Madison County, Virginia. It was built in 1793, reputedly after the plans of Thomas Jefferson.  In 1884, the house was
extensively enlarged and altered.  It is a -story, wood frame, Federal-style residence. The front facade features a pedimented Tuscan order portico.  The house is covered with weatherboarding and is topped by its original hipped roof.  Also on the property is the contributing smokehouse.  The house was built for William Madison, brother of President James Madison.

It was listed on the National Register of Historic Places in 1979.

References

Thomas Jefferson buildings
Madison family
Houses on the National Register of Historic Places in Virginia
Federal architecture in Virginia
Houses completed in 1793
Houses in Madison County, Virginia
National Register of Historic Places in Madison County, Virginia